Carmen Silva (April 5, 1916 – April 21, 2008), who was often credited as Carmem Silva, was a Brazilian television, stage and film actress. She was best known in recent years for her role on the Brazilian telenovela, Mulheres Apaixonadas in which she played Flora de Souza Duarte, the wife of Leopoldo Duarte (Oswaldo Louzada). Mulheres Apaixonadas was created by Manoel Carlos.

Biography 
Silva was born Maria Amália Feijó in Pelotas, Rio Grande do Sul, Brazil on April 5, 1916. Her acting career only began in earnest in 1939 when she took a job at Rádio Cultura in Pelotas. She worked at the station, as well as others, in various capacities, until she moved to São Paulo, where she joined Radio Tupi. She also worked on Rádio Record with Janete Clair. The two wrote programs aimed at a female audience.

Silva's career switched to the newly popular medium of television during the 1950s. She began acting in soap operas and telenovelas during the decade, including A Próxima Atração, Ossos do Barão, Sinal de Alerta, as well as the miniseries O Primo Basílio. She also founded her own theater company in  Rio Grande do Sul during the 1960s.

Silva hit a career highlight when she joined the popular Brazilian telenovela Mulheres Apaixonadas in 2003. She played an elderly character, Flora de Souza Duarte, while Brazilian actor Oswaldo Louzada portrayed her husband, Leopoldo Duarte, on the soap opera. Their characters often suffered ill treatment at the hands of their granddaughter, Dóris, who was played by actress Regiane Alves.

Carmen Silva last acting role was the in 2007 film, Valsa para Bruno Stein (Waltz for Bruno Stein), which was shown at the 2007 Festival de Gramado film festival.

Carmen Silva died of multiple organ dysfunction syndrome at the Hospital Mãe de Deus in age of 92 in Porto Alegre, Brazil, on April 21, 2008. She had been hospitalized since April 1, 2008, for treatment of her illness. Silva was buried at the Irmandade Arcanjo São Miguel e Almas cemetery in Porto Alegre.

Sadly, Oswaldo Louzada, who played her television husband on Mulheres Apaixonadas, also died from multiple organ dysfunction syndrome, the same disease that afflicted Silva on February 22, 2008.

Filmography

Film
1946: El Ángel desnudo
1949: Quase no Céu
1955: Carnaval em Lá Maior - Mulher de chapéu
1957: Rebelião em Vila Rica
1958: O Grande Momento
1970: Elas - (segment "O Artesanato de Ser Mulher")
1974: The Hand That Feeds the Dead
1974: Guerra Conjugal - Amália
1977: Contos Eróticos - Tia Cotinha (segment "As Três Virgens")
1982: Amor de Perversão
1983: Idolatrada
1990: O Gato de Botas Extraterrestre
1997: Até Logo, Mamãe (Short)
2002: Lembra, Meu Velho? (Short) - Dora
2003: A Festa de Margarette
2005: Café da Tarde (TV Short) - Iara
2007: Valsa para Bruno Stein - (final film role)

Television
1958: Cela da Morte
1970: Pigmalião 70 - Condessa Cavanca
1970: A Próxima Atração - Dona Saudade
1971: Minha Doce Namorada - Dona Nina
1972: Signo da Esperança (TV Tupi) - Lindolfa
1972: Bel-Ami (TV Tupi) - Gertrudes
1972: Quero Viver (Rede Record) - Carmela
1973: Vendaval (Rede Record)
1973: Vidas Marcadas (Rede Record)
1973: Venha Ver o Sol na Estrada (Rede Record) - Vovó Tonica
1973-1974: Os Ossos do Barão - Melica
1974-1975: Ídolo de Pano (TV Tupi) - Pauline de Clermon
1975: A Viagem (TV Tupi) - Dona Isaura
1977: Locomotivas - Adelaide
1978: Sinal de Alerta - Coló
1979: Cara a Cara (Rede Bandeirantes) - Milú
1980: Pé de Vento (Rede Bandeirantes) - Noca
1981: Baila Comigo
1981: Os Adolescentes (Rede Bandeirantes)
1982: Ninho da Serpente (Rede Bandeirantes) - Maria Clara
1982: Campeão (Rede Bandeirantes) - Joana
1983: Sabor de Mel (Rede Bandeirantes) - Jojô
1984: Meus Filhos, Minha Vida (SBT) - Ana
1988: O Primo Basílio (miniseries) - Dona Virgínia Lemos
2003: Mulheres Apaixonadas - Flora de Sousa Duarte
2003: Zorra Total - Flora de Sousa Duarte
2006: A Diarista (seriado - episódios Aquele da Chuva e Marinete Não Chega!) - Dona Gilda

References

External links 

 Folha Online: Oswaldo Louzada dies in Rio at 95 

1916 births
2008 deaths
Brazilian television actresses
Brazilian telenovela actresses
Brazilian stage actresses
Brazilian film actresses
Brazilian radio actresses
People from Rio Grande do Sul
People from Pelotas
Deaths from multiple organ failure